The Okhotsk atka mackerel (Pleurogrammus azonus), also known as the Arabesque greenling, is a mackerel-like species in the family Hexagrammidae. It is commonly known as hokke in Japan and imyeonsu in Korean. The primary population of the fish is found off the Sea of Okhotsk. According to legend, it was discovered by Nichiji.

Distribution and habitat
The Okhotsk atka mackerel is found in the northwest Pacific Ocean occurring in Primorskii Krai in Russia, the Sea of Okhotsk east to the Kuril Islands south to Ibaraki Prefecture and Tsushima in Japan and the Yellow Sea.

Taxonomy
The Okhotsk atka mackerel was first formally described in 1913 by the American ichthyologists David Starr Jordan and Charles William Metz with its type locality given as Nampo in North Korea. This species is occasionally considered synonymous with the Atka mackerel, P. monopterygius (Nelson 1994). However, it is probably a separate species. This fish was also documented as Stellistius katsukii but the older name Pleurogrammus azonus takes precedence.

Biology
The juvenile Okhotsk atka mackerel gather in large schools close the surface but the adults are benthic.

As food

The Okhotsk atka mackerel is an important fish, and approximately 100,000 tons of the species were harvested each year throughout the late 20th century.  Known in Japanese cuisine as hokke and in Korean cuisine as imyeonsu (임연수), the fish can be fresh, dried, or frozen, and can be served raw, boiled, grilled or fried.

Notes

References
 
 Nelson, J.S., 1994. Fishes of the World. Wiley, New York.
 Shinohara, G. and K. Amaoka, 1994. Stellistius katsukii Jordan & Tanaka, 1927, a junior synonym of Pleurogrammus azonus Jordan & Metz, 1913 (Scorpaeniformes: Hexagrammidae). Jap. J. Ichthyol. 40(4):487-490.

Okhotsk atka mackerel
Sea of Okhotsk
Okhotsk atka mackerel
Taxa named by David Starr Jordan